Eightmile Creek is a stream in the U.S. state of Minnesota. It is a tributary of Minnesota River.

Eightmile Creek was so named from its distance,  from Fort Ridgely.

See also
List of rivers of Minnesota

References

Rivers of Nicollet County, Minnesota
Rivers of Sibley County, Minnesota
Rivers of Minnesota